Eugène Sémérie (6 January 1832, Aix-en-Provence – 3 May 1884, Grasse) was a French doctor and writer involved with the positive movement.

In 1870 Sémérie was one of the founders of the Positivist Club, which was set up following the proclamation of the French Third Republic on 4 September 1870.

Works
 Des symptômes intellectuels de la folie / Paris : A. Delahaye, 1867 
 République occidentale ordre et progrès : Fondation d'un club positiviste / Paris : impr. de Jouaust, 1870 
 La République et le peuple souverain : mémoire lu au club positiviste de Paris dans sa séance du lundi 3 avril 1871 / Paris : A. Lacroix, Verboeckoven and co. , 1871 
 Positivistes et catholiques (2nd edition) with a new preface, Ernest Leroux éditeur, Avril 1873
 La grande crise 1789-1871, Neuchatel: Impr. de L.-A. Borel 1874
 Théologie et science : simple réponse à M. Dupanloup, évêque d'Orléans / 4e éd. / Paris : E. Leroux, 1875 
 Des symptômes intellectuels de la folie / (2nd edition) / Paris : E. Leroux, 1875 
 La loi des trois états : réponse à M. Renouvier, directeur de la Critique philosophique / Paris : E. Leroux, 1875 
 Des Sources biologiques de la notion d'humanité, Vichy: Impr. de Wallon, 1883
 Des hallucinations de la musculation : la conquête du microbe / Vichy : impr. de Wallon, 1883

References

1832 births
1884 deaths
Positivists